The European Journalism Training Association (EJTA) is a formal network of authorized European journalism training centres, enabling cooperation and exchanges of students and teachers. Within this network, international projects and education programmes are set up. In addition, EJTA organises conferences and seminars to discuss important journalistic issues. The members exchange ideas and information. This way they all work together on the improvement of journalistic education in Europe. 

The non-profit organisation was founded in Brussels in 1990. It’s a legal body under Dutch law. The EJTA office is located in Mechelen. The network has over 55 members from 25 different European countries to date.

Each year in May or June, EJTA holds its AGM as well as the Annual Conference. The annual EJTA Teachers’ Conference was organised for the first time in 2014. The journal Journalism Studies is published by Routledge on behalf of the European Journalism Training Association, the European Communication Research and Education Association and the Journalism Studies Division of the International Communication Association.

Tartu Declaration 
The Tartu Declaration was adopted at the AGM in Tartu (Estonia) in 2006 and was revised in 2013. It is a detailed analysis that states which principles the EJTA members have to respect when training and educating their students and participants. The Tartu Declaration lists ten core competences, each existing of five parts. Every member needs to sign and implement this declaration. If they do not do this, admission is impossible. This means that the institutions have to act in accordance with the principles and should master the ten competences.

Mobility Catalogue 
One of EJTA’s projects is the mobility catalogue. This catalogue helps journalism students find out which foreign institution (within Europe) is most appropriate for them to take courses at. It is possible to search for a programme or institution. Students can also find the right contact person and the criteria for admission per educational institution.

Member Organisations 

Albania
 Instituti Shqiptar i Medias (Albanian Media Institute)

Austria
 Center for Journalism and Communication Management, University for Continuing Education Krems
 Kuratorium für Journalistenausbildung

Belgium
 Arteveldehogeschool
 ARTESIS Plantijn Hogeschool
 Erasmus Hogeschool Brussel
 Hogeschool West-Vlaanderen / HOWEST
 Institut des Hautes Etudes des Communications Sociales
 PXL Hogeschool Limburg
 Thomas More Mechelen - Antwerpen

Bulgaria
 Sofia University

Denmark
 Danish School of Media and Journalism
 University of Southern Denmark (CfJ)

Estonia
 Tartu University

Finland
 Haaga-Helia University of Applied Sciences
 Turku University of Applied Sciences
 University of Helsinki
 University of Jyväskylä
 University of Tampere

France
 Centre formation des journalistes (CFJ)
 Ecole Supérieure de Journalisme de Paris
 FNSP (Science-Po – Ecole de Journalisme)
 Université Paris-Dauphine (IPJ)

Georgia
 Georgian Institute of Public Affairs, Caucasus School of Journalism and Media Management

Germany
 Akademie für Publizistik
 Deutsche Journalistenschule
 Hochschule Bonn-Rhein-Sieg University for Applied Sciences
 Jade University of Applied Sciences Institute for Media Management and Journalism
 Kölner Journalistenschule für Politik und Wirtschaft

Greece
 Aristotle University of Thessaloniki

Ireland
 Dublin Institute of Technology

Italy
 Catholic University of Milan (Università Cattolica del Sacro Cuore)
 University of Milan

Macedonia
 School of journalism and Public Relations

The Netherlands
 Christelijke Hogeschool Ede
 European Journalism Centre
 Fontys Hogeschool Journalistiek
 Hogeschool Utrecht
 Hogeschool Windesheim (Windesheim University of Applied Sciences)

Norway
 Oslo and Akershus University College of Applied Sciences

Portugal
 Centro Protocolar de Formação Profissional para Jornalistas

Romania
 Babeș-Bolyai University

Russia
 Federal State Autonomous Educational Institution for Higher Professional Education “North-Caucasus Federal University”
 M.V. Lomonosov Moscow State University

Spain
 Escuela de Periodismo UAM - El País
 Mondragon University (HUHEZI)

Sweden
 Göteborgs Universitet
 Linnaeus University
 Södertörn University
 Stockholm University

Switzerland
 MAZ – Die Schweizer Journalistenschule
 Zurich University of Applied Sciences (IAM Institute of Applied Media Studies)

Turkey
 Anadolu University
 Istanbul Bilgi University

United Kingdom
 Birmingham School of Media at Birmingham City University
 City University London
 Coventry University
 University of Lincoln

References

External links 
 

Journalism organizations in Europe
International organisations based in Belgium